Refuge Quintino Sella au Félik is a refuge in the Alps, in the comune of Gressoney-La-Trinité, Aosta Valley, Italy. It should not be confused with the similarly named Refuge Quintino Sella (Mont-Blanc) in the Mont Blanc massif or the Rifugio Quintino Sella al Monviso in the comune of Crissolo, Piedmont.

References

Mountain huts in the Alps
Mountain huts in Aosta Valley
Gressoney-La-Trinité